Krunoslav Simon (born 24 June 1985) is a Croatian professional basketball currently playing for Cedevita Junior of the Croatian League.

Professional career

After spending his youth years in KK Maksimir and KK Zrinjevac, Simon joined KK Zagreb in 1998, and he played there until 2012, when he signed with Unicaja Málaga of the Spanish League. On 25 June 2013 Simon signed a two-year deal with Lokomotiv Kuban.

On 22 July 2015 Simon signed a one-year contract with the Italian club EA7 Emporio Armani Milano. On 11 July 2016 he signed a two-year contract extension with Milano.

Anadolu Efes
On 9 July 2017 Simon signed a two-year contract with the Turkish club Anadolu Efes, with second year being optional. In 2017–18 season, he won the Turkish Basketball Cup with the club and was named the Turkish Basketball Cup Final MVP. In 26 appearances in the 2017–18 EuroLeague, he averaged 9.2 points, 3.9 rebounds and 3.4 assists per game.

In 2018–19 season, Simon improved his shooting accuracy from the field, as he averaged 9.4 points over 37 games in the 2018–19 EuroLeague with 48.3% shooting from the field. Anadolu Efes made its first appearance in the EuroLeague Final Four where they lost to the CSKA Moscow in the final game.

On 24 May 2019 Simon signed a two-year contract extension with Anadolu Efes. He signed another two-year (1+1) contract extension with the team on 20 July 2020.

On 8 July 2022, Simon parted ways with Anadolu Efes after five successful seasons together. The Turkish club also announced that they would retire the Croatian player's #44 jersey.

National team career
Simon debuted with the senior Croatian national team at the 2011 EuroBasket. He also represented Croatia at the 2013 EuroBasket, 2015 EuroBasket, 2017 EuroBasket and 2022 EuroBasket. He also represented Croatia at the 2014 FIBA World Cup and the 2016 Summer Olympics.

Career statistics

EuroLeague

|-
| style="text-align:left;"| 2011–12
| style="text-align:left;"| Zagreb
| 10 || 10 || 30.2 || .429 || .295 || .962 || 4.6 || 2.5 || .7 || .0 || 13.4 || 12.6
|-
| style="text-align:left;"| 2012–13
| style="text-align:left;"| Unicaja
| 22 || 17 || 24.9 || .391 || .380 || .885 || 3.3 || 2.5 || .4 || .1 || 10.0 || 8.8
|-
| style="text-align:left;"| 2013–14
| style="text-align:left;"| Lokomotiv
| 23 || 14 || 25.0 || .422 || .351 || .800 || 3.3 || 2.6 || 1.0 || .3 || 10.6 || 11.6
|-
| style="text-align:left;"| 2015–16
| style="text-align:left;" rowspan=2| Milano
| 10 || 4 || 26.5 || .444 || .271 || .704 || 4.0 || 2.8 || .6 || .3 || 10.7 || 9.3
|-
| style="text-align:left;"| 2016–17
| 21 || 9 || 27.6 || .451 || .370 || .875 || 3.6 || 3.9 || 1.0 || .2 || 11.0 || 12.7
|-
| style="text-align:left;"| 2017–18
| style="text-align:left;" rowspan=5| Anadolu Efes
| 26 || 22 || 28.2 || .384 || .339 || .818 || 3.9 || 3.4 || .8 || .2 || 9.2 || 9.5
|-
| style="text-align:left;"| 2018–19
| 37 || 22|| 24.8 || .483 || .403 || .843 || 3.8 || 2.8 || .9 || .2 || 9.4 || 11.9
|-
| style="text-align:left;"| 2019–20
| 27 || 13 || 23.3 || .479 || .440 || .857 || 3.9 || 2.9 || .6 || .2 || 8.9 || 10.9
|-
| style="text-align:left;background:#AFE6BA;"|2020–21†
| 35 || 28 || 25.6 || .486 || .403 || .769 || 3.1 || 3.3 || .5 || .3 || 10.3 || 12.2
|-
| style="text-align:left;background:#AFE6BA;"|2021–22†
| 27 || 13 || 21.2 || .417 || .274 || .926 || 2.8 || 2.6 || .5 || .1 || 6.9 || 7.7
|- class="sortbottom"
| colspan=2 style="text-align:center;"| Career
| 238 || 155 || 25.3 || .437 || .367 || .838 || 3.5 || 2.9 || .7 || .2 || 9.7 || 10.8

National team

References

External links

 Krunoslav Simon at euroleague.net
 Krunoslav Simon at FIBA archive
 Krunoslav Simon at FIBA Europe
 Krunoslav Simon at eurobasket.com
 Krunoslav Simon at legabasket.it 
 Krunoslav Simon at acb.com 
 Krunoslav Simon at tblstat.net

1985 births
Living people
2014 FIBA Basketball World Cup players
ABA League players
Anadolu Efes S.K. players
Baloncesto Málaga players
Basketball players at the 2016 Summer Olympics
Basketball players from Zagreb
Competitors at the 2009 Mediterranean Games
Croatian expatriate basketball people in Italy
Croatian expatriate basketball people in Russia
Croatian expatriate basketball people in Spain
Croatian expatriate basketball people in Turkey
Croatian men's basketball players
KK Zagreb players
Lega Basket Serie A players
Liga ACB players
Mediterranean Games gold medalists for Croatia
Mediterranean Games medalists in basketball
Olimpia Milano players
Olympic basketball players of Croatia
PBC Lokomotiv-Kuban players
Shooting guards
Small forwards
KK Cedevita Junior players